Ryan Peak, at  above sea level is the highest peak in the Boulder Mountains of Idaho. The peak is also on the border of Sawtooth National Recreation Area and Salmon-Challis National Forest and partially within the Hemingway–Boulders Wilderness.

Ryan Peak is the second highest peak in the Sawtooth National Recreation Area, after Castle Peak as well as the 16th highest peak in Idaho.

The primary route to Ryan Peak begins north of Ketchum along Idaho State Highway 75 at the Sawtooth National Recreation Area headquarters. Take national forest road 146 north from the headquarters until you reach the trailhead at the end of the road.

References

External links 

 Idaho Summits - Thompson Peak
 Sawtooth National Forest - Official Site
 SummitPost.org - Thompson Peak

Mountains of Idaho
Mountains of Custer County, Idaho
Salmon-Challis National Forest
Sawtooth National Forest